Joanna Aleksandra Pilichiewicz/Piwowarska (born November 4, 1983 in Wałcz) is a Polish pole vaulter. She set her personal best height of 4.53 metres by finishing second for the women's pole vault at the 2006 IAAF Super Grand Prix Meeting in Doha, Qatar.

Pilichiewicz/Piwowarska represented Poland at the 2008 Summer Olympics in Beijing, where she competed for the women's pole vault, along with her compatriots Monika Pyrek and Olympic bronze medalist Anna Rogowska. She successfully cleared a height of 4.30 metres in the qualifying rounds, finishing nineteenth overall, and tying her position with Greece's Afroditi Skafida and Portugal's Sandra-Helena Tavares.

Competition record

References

External links

NBC 2008 Olympics profile

Polish female pole vaulters
Living people
Olympic athletes of Poland
Athletes (track and field) at the 2008 Summer Olympics
People from Wałcz
1983 births
Sportspeople from West Pomeranian Voivodeship
Competitors at the 2009 Summer Universiade
Competitors at the 2011 Summer Universiade